Hugh Guthrie,  (13 August 1866 – 3 November 1939) was a Canadian lawyer and politician who served as a minister in the governments of Sir Robert Borden, Arthur Meighen and R. B. Bennett.

Biography 
He was born in Guelph, Ontario, the son of Donald Guthrie, and studied there and at Osgoode Hall, becoming a barrister. Guthrie was named a King's Counsel in 1902. He married Maude Henrietta, the daughter of Guelph businessman Thomas H. Scarff.

Guthrie was first elected to the House of Commons as a Liberal in 1900 from the riding of Wellington South. He sat in Wilfrid Laurier's caucus for 17 years, but crossed the floor to join the Unionist government of Robert Borden as a result of the Conscription Crisis of 1917. The former Liberal backbencher became a leading light in his new party, serving as solicitor general under Borden. With the end of World War I, most Liberal-Unionists either rejoined the Liberal Party or joined the new Progressive Party. Guthrie, however, stayed with the Conservatives, becoming minister of militia and defence and running for re-election as a Conservative in the 1921 election. After the election, he joined the Tories on the Opposition benches.

As a result of the 1926 "King-Byng Affair", Meighen's Conservatives formed a government in which Guthrie served as Minister of Justice and Minister of National Defence (acting until July 13). This second stint in Cabinet ended with the defeat of the Meighen government in that fall's election. Meighen lost his seat, and Guthrie served as Leader of the Opposition and interim leader of the Conservative Party for a full year.

Guthie sought the party leadership at the leadership convention that the party held in 1927, but was defeated by R.B. Bennett. John Diefenbaker was a delegate to that convention and he wrote in his memoirs that Guthrie's candidacy was hurt when the former Liberal absent-mindedly declared in his speech to delegates that the Tory meeting was the "greatest Liberal convention in history".

Bennett led the Tories to victory in the 1930 election, and Guthrie was appointed Minister of Justice and Attorney General. In 1931, he led the Canadian delegation to the League of Nations. In 1933, he introduced legislation making it illegal to carry a concealed weapon without authorization. In 1935, he clashed with opposition Member of Parliament Agnes Macphail who demanded an inquiry into inhumane conditions in Canada's prisons such as the whipping of prisoners.

As the Great Depression worsened and millions were unemployed, the government became increasingly concerned about political instability and the growth of radical movements. Guthrie's department was responsible for the persecution of the Communist Party of Canada, and the arrest and incarceration of Communists, including leader Tim Buck, for sedition.

In 1933,Tim Buck was shot at by soldiers in an apparent assassination attempt while he was in his cell during a prison riot. Guthrie was forced to admit that the attack was deliberate, but claimed the intent was only to frighten him; however, the public outcry at this incident lead to Buck being released.

In 1935, unemployed workers in British Columbia deserted the remote relief camps established by the Bennett government, and began the "On to Ottawa Trek". Thousands of unemployed workers hopped on freight trains heading east intending to converge in Ottawa and press their demands on the government. Bennett's cabinet saw this as an insurrectionary movement and panicked. In the House of Commons, Guthrie charged that the protesters "were a distinct menace to the peace, order and good government of Canada."

As the protesters entered Saskatchewan, Guthrie had the Trek banned, over the objections of Saskatchewan Premier James G. Gardiner. He and Bennett ordered the Royal Canadian Mounted Police to use tear gas and revolvers to break up the Trek when it entered Regina. The city was but under siege with hundreds of police officers moved in blocking all exits from the city. On July 1, 1935, the police attacked a meeting attended by 3,000 people resulting in one death, dozens of injuries and national outrage.

Guthrie, now 69, did not run in the 1935 election that routed Bennett's government, preferring to retire from politics. He died four years later.

Electoral record (Wellington South)

|- 

|Hugh GUTHRIE
|align="right"| acclaimed

References 

 Canadian Parliamentary Guide (1934), AL Normandin

External links 
 

1866 births
1939 deaths
Lawyers in Ontario
Canadian King's Counsel
Leaders of the Conservative Party of Canada (1867–1942)
Liberal Party of Canada MPs
Unionist Party (Canada) MPs
Liberal-Unionist MPs in Canada
Members of the House of Commons of Canada from Ontario
Members of the King's Privy Council for Canada
Leaders of the Opposition (Canada)
Solicitors General of Canada